The 2021 season is Grêmio Foot-Ball Porto Alegrense's 118th season in existence and the club's 16th consecutive season in the top flight of Brazilian football. In addition to the domestic league, Grêmio participates in this season's editions of the Copa do Brasil, the Campeonato Gaúcho, the Copa CONMEBOL Libertadores and the Copa CONMEBOL Sudamericana. The season covers the period from 1 March 2021 to 31 December 2021, a shorter season due to the COVID-19 pandemic.

Squad information

First team squad

Competitions

Overview

Recopa Gaúcha

Campeonato Gaúcho

Results summary

First stage

Table

Results by matchday

Matches
The first stage fixtures were announced on 21 December 2020.

Note: Match numbers indicated on the left hand side are references to the matchday scheduled by the Campeonato Gaúcho and not the order matches were played after postponements and rescheduled matches.

Knockout stage

Semi-finals

Finals

Copa CONMEBOL Libertadores

Qualifying stages

The draw for the qualifying stages was held on 5 February 2021, 12:00 UTC−03:00.

Second stage

Third stage

Copa CONMEBOL Sudamericana

Group stage

The draw for the group stage was held on 9 April 2021, 13:00 UTC−03:00, at the CONMEBOL Convention Centre in Luque, Paraguay.

Matches

Final stage

The draw for the final stage was held on 1 June 2021, 13:00 UTC−03:00, at the CONMEBOL Convention Centre in Luque, Paraguay.

Round of 16

Campeonato Brasileiro Série A

League table

Results summary

Results by matchday

Matches
The league fixtures were announced on 24 March 2021.

Note: Match numbers indicated on the left hand side are references to the matchday scheduled by the Campeonato Brasileiro Série A and not the order matches were played after postponements and rescheduled matches.

Copa do Brasil

Third round
The draw for the third round was held on 23 April 2021, 14:00 UTC−03:00, at the CBF headquarters in Rio de Janeiro.

Round of 16
The draw for the round of 16 was held on 22 June 2021, 16:00 UTC−03:00, at the CBF headquarters in Rio de Janeiro.

Quarter-finals
The draw for quarter-finals was held on 6 August 2021, 15:00 UTC-03:00, at the CBF headquarters in Rio de Janeiro.

Notes

References

2021 Season
Brazilian football clubs 2021 season